Typhonium cochleare is a species of plant in the arum family that is native to Australia.

Description
The species is a geophytic, perennial herb, which sprouts from a corm about 2 cm in diameter. The leaves are very variable in shape. The flower is enclosed in a spathe about 17 cm long.

Distribution and habitat
The species occurs in the tropical Top End of the Northern Territory from Darwin to Arnhemland, mainly in open forest.

References

 
cochleare
Monocots of Australia
Flora of the Northern Territory
Plants described in 1993
Taxa named by Alistair Hay